Liga Deportiva Universitaria de Quito's 2009 season was the club's 56th year in professional football, and the 48th in the top level of professional football in Ecuador. The club participated in their 14th Copa Libertadores, where they unsuccessfully defended their 2008 title. The club also participate in, and won, their first Recopa Sudamericana. They also won their first Copa Sudamericana title.

This season marked the second coaching tenure of Uruguayan Jorge Fossati. He previously led the team between 2003 and 2004, and led the team to their 7th national championship in 2003.

Club

Personnel
President: Carlos Arroyo
Honorary President: Rodrigo Paz
Manager: Jorge Fossati
President of the Football Commission: Edwin Ripalda
Assistant: Eduardo de Capellán
Physical Trainer: Alejandro Valenzuela

Kits

|-
|
|
|
|
|}

Squad information

Note: Caps and goals are of the national league and are current as of the beginning of the season.

Copa Libertadores squad

Recopa Sudamericana squad

Copa Sudamericana squad

 

 

 
 

:1.Alex Bolaños replaced Enrique Vera on November 11 due to injury.

Winter transfers

Summer transfers

Competitions

Overall

Pre-season
LDU Quito played two preseason friendlies prior to the start of the Serie A season

La Noche Blanca is the club's official presentation for the season. They hosted Colombian club Santa Fe.

Serie A

2009 is the club's 48th season in the top-level of professional football in Ecuador. The first game of the season began on January 31, with LDU Quito's first game on February 1.

First stage
The first stage was a double round-robin tournament. LDU Quito finished 2nd and qualified to the Third Stage with 2 bonus points.

Second stage
Liga was placed into Group 1 with Barcelona, Deportivo Cuenca, El Nacional, LDU Portoviejo, and Macará. They will also play Deportivo Quito in a "clásico". They finished first in their group and earned an extra bonus point toward the Third Stage.

Third stage
LDU Quito has qualified to the third stage twice, and has earned 3 bonus points for this stage. They are placed into Group 1 with Deportivo Quito, Macará, and Manta. This stage is scheduled to begin on October 18 and end on November 22.

Fourth stage
Liga qualified to the third-place playoff of the fourth stage. They competed against Emelec for third-place and a berth in the 2010 Copa Libertadores first stage.

Copa Libertadores

As the defending champion, LDU Quito automatically earned a berth in this year's tournament. This was the 14th time the club participated in the continent's premier club tournament. They were drawn into the Group 1 along with 2008 Copa do Brasil winner Sport Recife, the Chilean 2008 Clausura champion Colo-Colo, and the winner of the 5th preliminary match Palmeiras. The Group Stage began on February 11, with LDU Quito's first game on February 17.

LDU Quito started their title defense on a high note with a 3–2 home win against Palmeiras. This win was followed by two successive shut-out away losses in Recife and Santiago. A close home draw followed against Colo-Colo. Their last two matches were losses away and at home. They were eliminated from the competition on April 22 when Colo-Colo lost to Sport Recife.

Recopa Sudamericana

As the 2008 Copa Libertadores champion, LDU Quito qualified for this year's Recopa Sudamericana. They played against the 2008 Copa Sudamericana winner Sport Club Internacional in a two-legged match-up. This is LDU Quito's first Recopa Sudamericana. Internacional previously won the competition in 2007. The first leg was played at Internacional's stadium, Beira-Rio in Porto Alegre. Argentine Claudio Bieler provided the lone goal of the game for Liga. The second leg, played back in Quito at La Casa Blanca, was won decisively by the home team 3 goals to none. Carlos Espínola, Claudio Bieler, and recently signed Enrique Vera provided the scores for Liga. The Recopa title is LDU Quito's second international title.

Copa Sudamericana

LDU Quito qualified for the 2009 Copa Sudamericana on July 5. By finishing 2nd in the First Stage of the Serie A, Liga earned the Ecuador 2 berth and started in the First Stage of the competition. Liga's opponent in the First Stage is Paraguayan club Libertad. The first leg was played at home at La Casa Blanca. Néicer Reasco scored the only goal of the match in stoppage time of the first half. The second leg, played in Asunción on August 25, ended in a draw. Javier González put the home team ahead in the first half. Édison Méndez scored a second half goal to keep LDU Quito the overall advantage. Liga's Round of 16 tie against Lanús opened at home. Argentine striker Claudio Bieler scored a hat-trick in the first half before Édison Méndez scored the final goal at the end of regulation time to give Liga a four-goal advantage going into the second leg. In second leg, Lanús came out strong, but were unable to get one past goalkeeper Alexander Domínguez. Claudio Bieler  finally broke the tie in the 71st minute with a long-range free-kick from outside the box. Santiago Salcedo tied it for the home team before the end of regulation. LDU Quito advanced to the Quarterfinals 4–1 on points. In the Quarterfinals, Liga played Vélez Sársfield, also from Argentina. In both games, Liga came from behind to get favorable results. In the first leg in Buenos Aires, Hernán Rodrigo López scored first for the locals to give them the lead. A brilliant play by Néicer Reasco led to a pass to Claudio Bieler who scored the equalizer, from the floor after being tripped, to give Liga an away goal and the tie. The second leg in Quito started the same after Hernán Rodrigo López scored first for Vélez to give them the overall advantage. But Enrique Vera and Carlos Espínola scored in the second half to give Liga the win and a place in the semifinals. In the Semifinals, Liga played River Plate from Montevideo, Uruguay. The first leg of the semifinal was played at the famed Estadio Centenario. River took the first leg 2–1 when Jorge Córdoba scored the winner in the second half of the match. Liga avenged their first loss in the tournament with a lopsided 7–0 win at home. Claudio Bieler scored another hat-trick in the tournament, in addition to goals from Carlos Espínola, Ulises de la Cruz, Miler Bolaños, and Édison Méndez. The win at home is officially the most lopsided win in the history of the tournament. Liga will play Brazilian club Fluminense in the Finals. This is a repeat of the 2008 Copa Libertadores Final. The first leg was played at home. Marquinho scored within the first minute of the game for Fluminense to put them ahead early. However, Liga persisted and answered back with a hat-trick by Méndez in the 21', 44, and 60'. Franklin Salas and Ulises de la Cruz added two more in the 78' and 87' to give Liga a huge 5–1 win and a four-goal advantage going into the second leg. The second leg at Maracanã ended the same way it did in 2008: a Fluminense win. This time, Fluminense won 3–0 and was unable to overcome the four-goal difference. Liga won the Copa Sudamericana and become the Ecuadorian club to win CONMEBOL's three major tournaments.

Peace Cup

LDU Quito were invited to participate in the 2009 Peace Cup, a friendly international club tournament organized by Sunmoon Peace Football Foundation, in Spain. For the Group Stage, they were drawn into Group B with Saudi Al-Ittihad and Spanish giants Real Madrid.

Statistics

See also
2009 in Ecuadorian football

References

External links
Official website 
LDU Portoviejo (2) - LDU Quito (1)
Manta (0) - LDU Quito (2)

2009
Ldu Quito